Jean-Louis Vaudoyer (10 September 1883, in Le Plessis-Robinson, Hauts-de-Seine – 20 May 1963) was a French novelist, poet, essayist and art historian. He was also administrator general of the Comédie-Française from 1941 to 1944.

External links 
Académie française

1883 births
1963 deaths
People from Hauts-de-Seine
20th-century French novelists
French art historians
Members of the Académie Française
Administrators of the Comédie-Française
French male essayists
French male poets
French male novelists
20th-century French poets
20th-century French essayists
20th-century French male writers